was the second ruler of Northern Fujiwara in Mutsu Province, Japan, the son of Fujiwara no Kiyohira and the father of Fujiwara no Hidehira.

Fujiwara no Motohira is credited with expansion of Hiraizumi, the residence of Northern Fujiwara. In particular, he founded Mōtsū-ji, and his wife built Kanjizaiō-in which was adjacent to Motsu-ji. Both sites survived, though all the buildings from the Heian period were lost, and are currently listed as constituents of a World Heritage Site, Historic Monuments and Sites of Hiraizumi. He also expanded Chūson-ji, where he was buried, along with his father and his son.

References

1105 births
1157 deaths
Ōshu-Fujiwara clan
Heian period Buddhists
People from Iwate Prefecture
People of Heian-period Japan